The Cincinnati Bengals are a National Football League (NFL) franchise founded as an expansion team of the American Football League in 1968. They joined the National Football League as a result of the 1970 AFL–NFL merger.
The Bengals' first draft selection was Bob Johnson, a center from the University of Tennessee. The team's most recent first-round selection was Daxton Hill, a defensive back from the University of Michigan. The Bengals have selected the number one overall pick in the draft four times. They have also selected the second overall pick two times and the third overall pick four times. The team's four selections from the University of Alabama are the most chosen by the Bengals from one university. The Bengals have used a first round pick on a Heisman Trophy winner three times, Archie Griffin, Carson Palmer, and Joe Burrow.

Every year during April, each NFL franchise seeks to add new players to its roster through a collegiate draft known as "the NFL Annual Player Selection Meeting", which is more commonly known as the NFL Draft. Teams are ranked in inverse order based on the previous season's record, with the worst record picking first, and the second worst picking second and so on. The two exceptions to this order are made for teams that appeared in the previous Super Bowl; the Super Bowl champion always picks 32nd, and the Super Bowl loser always picks 31st. Teams have the option of trading away their picks to other teams for different picks, players, cash, or a combination thereof. Thus, it is not uncommon for a team's actual draft pick to differ from their assigned draft pick, or for a team to have extra or no draft picks in any round due to these trades.

Key

Player selections

Footnotes

References 

 
 
 
 
 
 
 
 
 
 
 
 

 
 
 
 
 
 
 
 
 
 
 

Cincinnati Bengals

first-round draft picks